The 24th Arizona State Legislature, consisting of the Arizona State Senate and the Arizona House of Representatives, was constituted in Phoenix from January 1, 1959, to December 31, 1960, during the first of three terms of Paul Fannin's time as Governor of Arizona. The number of senators remained constant at two per county, totaling 28, and the members of the house of representatives also held steady at 80. The Democrats picked up a seat in the upper house, increasing their edge to 27–1.   In the House, the Republicans picked up three seats, however the Democrats still held a 54–26 edge.

Sessions
The Legislature met for two regular sessions at the State Capitol in Phoenix. The first opened on January 12, 1959, and adjourned on March 31; while the second convened on January 11, 1960, and adjourned on March 26. There were no Special Sessions.

State Senate

Members

The asterisk (*) denotes members of the previous Legislature who continued in office as members of this Legislature.

The ** denotes that Thelma Bollinger was appointed to the seat vacated upon the death of C. Clyde Bollinger

House of Representatives

Members 
The asterisk (*) denotes members of the previous Legislature who continued in office as members of this Legislature.

References

Arizona legislative sessions
1959 in Arizona
1960 in Arizona
1959 U.S. legislative sessions
1960 U.S. legislative sessions